Here is a list of Mississippi's congressional districts by their Human Development Index.

Very high
1. Mississippi's 3rd congressional district – 0.872
 Mississippi state average – 0.867
2. Mississippi's 1st congressional district – 0.866

3. Mississippi's 4th congressional district – 0.860

4. Mississippi's 2nd congressional district – 0.851

References

 
Congressional districts